João da Nova (born c. 1460 in Maceda, Ourense, Galicia; died July 16, 1509 in Kochi, India) was a Portuguese-Galician explorer of the Atlantic and Indian Oceans at the service of Portugal. He is credited as the discoverer of Ascension and Saint Helena islands.

The Juan de Nova Island, in the Mozambique Channel, is named after him. The Farquhar atoll (in the Seychelles) was, for a long time, known as the João da Nova islands. It is sometimes thought that the Agaléga islands (in the Indian Ocean) was also named after him (although it is almost certain he never visited them).

Biography
Juan da Nova was born into a noble family in Maceda, Galicia, then a constituent kingdom of the Crown of Castile. Nova was sent by his family to Portugal, where he grew up, to escape the struggles between aristocratic factions known as the Irmandiño wars. In Portugal, he was also known as João Galego ("the Galician"). In 1496, he was appointed as Alcaide menor (Mayor) of Lisbon by   king   Manuel I.

First Voyage to India 

On 9 or 10 March 1501, João da Nova departed as commander of the third Portuguese expedition to India, leading a small four vessel fleet under a joint private initiative of Florentine Bartolomeo Marchionni and Portuguese D. Álvaro of Braganza. On the outward leg of this expedition, in May 1501, Nova is believed to have sighted Ascension Island in the South Atlantic. After doubling the Cape, he is said to also have discovered what has since been called Juan de Nova Island in the Mozambique Channel. 

Arriving in India, Nova established a feitoria (trading post) in Cannanore and left behind a factor (on behalf of the private Marchionni-Braganza consortium, not the Portuguese crown).  On December 31, 1501, João da Nova's little fleet engaged the fleet of the Zamorin of Calicut in a battle outside of Cannanore harbor, the first Portuguese naval battle in the Indian Ocean.  Some historians have conjectured that Nova (or one of his captains) might also have visited the island of Ceylon at some point on this trip, four years before the first officially documented Portuguese visit by D. Lourenço de Almeida in 1505-6.

Nova's armada left India in January 1502. On his return journey, Nova is said to have discovered the South Atlantic island of Saint Helena on 21 May 1502, the feast day of Helena of Constantinople. However, a paper published in 2015 reviewed the discovery date and suggests Jan Huyghen van Linschoten was probably the first (in 1596) to state that the island was so named because it was found on the 21 May. Given that Linschoten correctly stated Whitsunday fell on the Western Christian date of 21 May 1589 (rather than the Orthodox Church date of 28 May), the paper suggests that Linschoten was referring to the Protestant feast-day for Saint Helena on 21 May, not the Orthodox Church version on the same date. It is then argued the Portuguese found the island two decades before the start of the Reformation and the establishment of Protestantism, and it is therefore not possible that the island was so named because it was found on the Protestant feast day. An alternative discovery date of 3 May on the Catholic feast-day celebrating the finding of the True Cross by Saint Helena in Jerusalem, as quoted by Odoardo Duarte Lopes in 1591 and by Sir Thomas Herbert in 1638, is suggested as historically more credible than the Protestant date of 21 May. The paper observes that if da Nova made the discovery on 3 May 1502, he may have been inhibited from naming the island Ilha de Vera Cruz (Island of the True Cross) because Pedro Álvares Cabral had already assigned that same name to the Brazilian coastline, which he thought to be a large island, on 3 May 1500. News of Cabral’s discovery reached Lisbon directly from South America before da Nova’s fleet set off on the voyage to India in 1501. If da Nova knew the True Cross name had already been assigned, the most obvious and plausible alternative name for him to give the island was "Santa Helena".

Second Voyage to India

1505-06
On 5 March 1505, he undertook another voyage to India as captain of the Flor de la Mar in the 7th Portuguese India armada commanded by Francisco de Almeida, the first Portuguese Viceroy of India. Nova had been granted credentials by the king entitling him to be Captain-Major of the Indian coast fleet if suitable. In East Africa, the armada captured Kilwa (in which event Nova played a critical role relaying secret missives between Almeida and local pretender Muhammad Arcone) and proceeded to raid Mombassa.
 
After crossing the Indian Ocean, the armada spent some time erecting forts and raiding ports, before eventually arriving at Cochin in October. There D. Francisco de Almeida inaugurated his term as Viceroy of Portuguese India, but refused to allow João da Nova to invoke his credentials as Captain-Major of the Indian coastal patrol. Almeida claimed that the Flor de la Mar was too large to enter the Indian coastal inlets and lagoons and thus unsuitable as a patrol ship. Almeida offered João da Nova the option of switching to a caravel, and sending the Flor back under another captain, but Nova chose to bring her back to Lisbon himself. Almeida then appointed his own son, Lourenço de Almeida, as captain-major of the patrol.

Leaving India in February 1506, Nova's heavy-laden Flor de la Mar, developed a leak in the hull in the environs of Zanzibar and was forced to stop for repairs in the islands of the Mozambique Channel. He would spend the next eight months in the area repairing the ship, a delay prolonged by illness and contrary winds.

1507
He was still stranded with his leaky ship in February, 1507, when the 8th Armada, under command of Tristão da Cunha, arrived in Mozambique Island. Cunha helped complete the repairs, transferred its cargo to a Lisbon-bound transport, and annexed Nova and the Flor de la Mar into his own India-bound fleet.

João da Nova took part in the Portuguese capture of Socotra in August 1507. Much to his surprise, he was assigned to remain in Socotra with the Red Sea patrol, a detachment of six ships under D. Afonso de Albuquerque's command, rather than continue with Cunha on to India. But his presence in the Red Sea patrol turned out to be a disturbance to Albuquerque, even if his exact role in the subsequent "mutiny of the captains" may have been somewhat murky. Besides his own frustrations, Nova regaled fellow patrol captains with tales of Indian riches, a much more attractive option than the barren coasts of Arabia they were assigned to patrol. In August–September, 1507, Albuquerque led his little squad into the Gulf of Oman and began to raid a series of coastal cities in succession - Qalhat, Qurayyat, Muscat - signalling his intention to proceed in this manner all the way up the Arabian coast and across to the island of Hormuz. The patrol captains, who were lured to the East Indies with dreams of quick and easy riches, balked at the prospect of a tiring succession of profitless, dangerous fights with insufficient men-at-arms. After Muscat, the exhausted João da Nova submitted a formal request to Albuquerque for permission to leave the patrol and proceed to India (ostensibly to request reinforcements from the viceroy Almeida). When this was denied, Nova protested and was placed under arrest. He was later pardoned and released, as his command was needed for the Battle of Hormuz in October, 1507.

1508
Shortly after the battle, Nova once again was at the center of a renewed series of complaints, this time over the establishment of a fortress in the city of Hormuz. In early 1508, during the construction of the fortress, three of the patrol ships slipped away from Albuquerque's sight and set sail to India, intending to lodge formal complaints against Albuquerque with the vice-roy Francisco de Almeida in Cochin. João da Nova was not among them, but Albuquerque nonetheless decided to let him go as well, hoping that by this belated magnanimous gesture, Nova might argue on his behalf. He didn't. Once in Cochin, João da Nova joined the three other captains in opening a formal case against Albuquerque.

1509
João da Nova fought in the Battle of Diu in February 1509, his ship, the Flor de la Mar, being used by the vice-roy Francisco de Almeida as the flagship of the Portuguese battle fleet. In March of that year, Afonso de Albuquerque, by then in Cochin himself, invoked his own secret credentials to relieve Francisco de Almeida as governor of India. But João da Nova, along with the other captains, assembled a petition demanding that Almeida refused to yield it, characterizing Albuquerque as unfit to govern. In May of the same year, Almeida formally opened a council in Cochin to consider the reception of Albuquerque.  Nova and the other patrol captains presented the case against him.

João da Nova died shortly after, in July 1509, just a couple of weeks before Almeida delivered the indictment and ordered Albuquerque's arrest. In spite of all this, Albuquerque is said to have personally paid for Nova's funeral in memory of his achievements in the Hormuz campaign.

See also
4th Portuguese India Armada (Gama, 1502)
7th Portuguese India Armada (Almeida, 1505)
Exploration of Asia
List of maritime explorers

Notes

References

Sources

1460s births
1509 deaths
People from Allariz – Maceda
Portuguese explorers
16th-century explorers
Explorers of Asia
Explorers of India
Recipients of Portuguese royal pardons
History of Kerala
Maritime history of Portugal